Ivan Petkov Kolev (Plovdiv 1 November 1930 – 1 July 2005) was a Bulgarian football player and coach.

He represented Bulgaria at both the 1962 FIFA World Cup and the 1966 FIFA World Cup, He also played for the Bulgarian Olympic team and won a bronze medal at the 1956 Summer Olympics.

Kolev played for Sportist Sofia from 1945 to 1948, VVS Sofia from 1949 to 1950, CSKA from 1950 to 1967 (304 matches, 90 goals in A PFG) and Sliven in 1967/68 season. He was the first Bulgarian nominated for the Golden Ball. He holds the record for the most league appearances in The Eternal Derby of Bulgaria – 27.

References

1930 births
2005 deaths
Bulgarian footballers
1962 FIFA World Cup players
1966 FIFA World Cup players
Bulgarian football managers
Footballers from Sofia
PFC CSKA Sofia players
Footballers at the 1952 Summer Olympics
Footballers at the 1956 Summer Olympics
Footballers at the 1960 Summer Olympics
Olympic footballers of Bulgaria
Olympic bronze medalists for Bulgaria
Bulgaria international footballers
Olympic medalists in football
First Professional Football League (Bulgaria) players
Medalists at the 1956 Summer Olympics
Association football forwards